Loreto Cristina Vallejos Dávila is a Chilean teacher who was elected as a member of the Chilean Constitutional Convention.

On 17 August 2021, she left The List of the People.

References

External links
 BCN Profile

Living people
1980 births
Chilean people
21st-century Chilean politicians
Pontifical Catholic University of Valparaíso alumni
Members of the List of the People
Members of the Chilean Constitutional Convention
21st-century Chilean women politicians
People from Viña del Mar